The 2011 FIFA Women's World Cup qualification UEFA Group 8 was a UEFA qualifying group for the 2011 FIFA Women's World Cup. The group comprised Sweden, the Czech Republic, Belgium, Wales and Azerbaijan. 

Sweden won the group and advanced to the play-off rounds.

Standings

Results

External links
 Regulations of the European Qualifying Competition for the 6th FIFA Women's World Cup

8
2009–10 in Czech football
2010–11 in Czech football
2010 in Swedish women's football
2009 in Swedish women's football
2009–10 in Belgian football
2010–11 in Belgian football
2009–10 in Welsh women's football
2010–11 in Welsh women's football
2009–10 in Azerbaijani football
2010–11 in Azerbaijani football
Qual